Laye is a department or commune of Kourwéogo Province in central  Burkina Faso. Its capital lies at the town of Laye. According to the 1996 census the department has a total population of 11,915.

Towns and villages
 Laye (5 136 inhabitants) (capital)
 Barama (978 inhabitants)
 Boulala (981 inhabitants)
 Gantin (825 inhabitants)
 Gantogodo (998 inhabitants)
 Sapeo (785 inhabitants)
 Laye yarcé (226 inhabitants)
 Sondré (570 inhabitants)
 Wanonghin (202 inhabitants)
 Yactenga (1 214 inhabitants)

References

Departments of Burkina Faso
Kourwéogo Province